Juan Kauppama Cailles (born Juan Cailles y Kauppama; November 10, 1871 – June 28, 1951) was a Filipino of French-Indian descent. A member of the revolutionary movement Katipunan, he was a commanding officer of the Philippine Revolutionary Army who served during the Philippine Revolution and Philippine–American War. He later served as a provincial governor of Laguna and a representative from Mountain Province.

Early life
Cailles was born in Nasugbu, Batangas, to Hippolyte Cailles, from Lyon, France and María Kauppama of Kerala in what was then British India. He was the fifth of seven children together with siblings León, Julia, Isidoro, Julio, Victoria and Cecilia.

His early education was at the house of Olvidio Caballero and he graduated from the Jesuit-run Escuela Normal in Manila (now Ateneo de Manila University).

He became a teacher and taught for five years in the public schools of Amaya, Tanza and Rosario, Cavite.

Philippine Revolution
When the premature discovery of the Katipunan in Manila forced its Supremo, Andrés Bonifacio to start the Philippine Revolution, Cailles organized a force composed of his pupils' fathers. To them, he remained Maestrong Cailles despite his successive promotions in military rank.

He took part in many encounters with the Spaniards, particularly in engagements resulting in the deaths of his superior officers, such General Candido Tria Tirona, Edilberto Evangelista, and Crispulo Aguinaldo, which caused his rapid promotion. With the Pact of Biak-na-Bato in 1897, hostilities ceased.

Philippine–American War
At the outbreak of the Spanish–American War in 1898, American forces arrived in the Philippines, defeating the Spanish at the Battle of Manila Bay on May 1, 1898, subsequently seizing the capital during the Battle of Manila of 1898. The Philippine–American War broke out in February 1899 with the 1899 Battle of Manila.

Cailles succeeded General Paciano Rizal as Laguna's military commander in July 1900 at the height of incisive attacks by the American forces. Cailles formed six military columns led by Lt. Col. Regino Diaz Relova (Pila, Bay, Calauan and Los Baños), General Severino Taino (San Pedro, Biñan, Santa Rosa, Cabuyao and Calamba), Lt. Canuto Aritao (Lumbang, Longos, San Antonio, Paete, Pakil and Pangil), Major Roman Dimayuga/Lt. Col. Pedro Caballes (Santa Cruz, Pagsanjan, Cavinti, Luisiana and Majayjay), Col. Julio Infante (Magdalena, Liliw, Rizal, Nagcarlan and San Pablo), and Lt. Col. Fidel Angeles (who died in the Battle of Mabitac) in Siniloan, Mabitac and Santa Maria (Gleeck, 1981, p. 4–5).

On September 17, 1900, Cailles' troops outmanoeuvred and routed a strong American contingent led by a Colonel Cheetham during the Battle of Mabitac in Laguna Province. Magnanimous in victory, Cailles allowed Cheetham to recover the bodies of eight slain Americans from the field, together with all their personal belongings.

After serving as acting chief of operations in the first zone of Manila during the War, Cailles was appointed by Emilio Aguinaldo as military governor of Laguna and half of Tayabas (now Quezon Province). Aguinaldo's capture in Palanan, Isabela on March 23, 1901, convinced Cailles that the war was lost, leading to his own surrender to American troops on June 20.

Postwar
Cailles then directed his efforts toward rebuilding the country. He served as governor of Laguna from 1901 to 1910 and again from 1916 to 1925. After his second term, he was appointed representative of the Mountain Province in the Philippine Legislature in 1925 and reappointed in 1928. In 1931, Cailles was again selected governor of Laguna and reelected in 1934.

It was during his term as governor that the Sakdal uprising flared up on May 2, 1935, in Santa Rosa and Cabuyao, Laguna. The revolt was suppressed in record time, thanks to Cailles’ firm administration and revolutionary experience. Cailles had also a hand in the capture of Teodoro Asedillo, the "Terror of the Sierra".

Death
Cailles died on June 28, 1951 from a heart attack. His body was interred at the Old Cemetery of Santa Cruz, Laguna. On January 11, 2014, his remains were transferred to Libingan ng mga Bayani.

Images

References

 Gleeck, Lewis, Jr. Laguna in American Times: Coconuts and Revolucionarios. Manila: Historical Conservation Society, 1981, pp. 1–12.
 National Historical Institute; Historical Markers: Regions I–IV and CAR. Manila: National Historical Institute, 1993.

1871 births
1951 deaths
Filipino military personnel
Filipino schoolteachers
People from Batangas
People of the Philippine–American War
People of the Philippine Revolution
People from Tanza, Cavite
Members of the House of Representatives of the Philippines from Mountain Province
Governors of Laguna (province)
Filipino people of Indian descent
Filipino people of French descent
Members of the Philippine Legislature
20th-century Filipino educators